Eric McCalla (born 18 August 1960) is a British athlete. He competed in the men's triple jump at the 1984 Summer Olympics.

References

1960 births
Living people
Athletes (track and field) at the 1984 Summer Olympics
British male triple jumpers
Olympic athletes of Great Britain
Place of birth missing (living people)